= Autovía A-495 =

Highway in Andalusia, Spain

The Autovía A-495 is a highway in Spain. It passes through Andalusia.
